Miloš Babić (born 10 September 1981) is a Bosnian-Herzegovinian retired football midfielder.

Club career
He has played for Serbian top league club FK Obilić, Greek Paniliakos F.C. and Bosnian clubs FK Borac Banja Luka, FK Sarajevo, FK Laktaši and FK Leotar.

Honours
FK Sarajevo
Premier League of Bosnia and Herzegovina: 2006-07

External links
 
 
 

1981 births
Living people
Sportspeople from Banja Luka
Association football midfielders
Bosnia and Herzegovina footballers
FK Obilić players
FK Borac Banja Luka players
Paniliakos F.C. players
FK Sarajevo players
FK Laktaši players
FK Leotar players
FK BSK Banja Luka players
First League of Serbia and Montenegro players
Premier League of Bosnia and Herzegovina players
Football League (Greece) players
First League of the Republika Srpska players
Bosnia and Herzegovina expatriate footballers
Expatriate footballers in Serbia and Montenegro
Bosnia and Herzegovina expatriate sportspeople in Serbia and Montenegro
Expatriate footballers in Greece
Bosnia and Herzegovina expatriate sportspeople in Greece